Little Surprises (also known as The Best Night, The Red Eye) is a 1996 American short film directed by Jeff Goldblum. The film was nominated for an Academy Award for Best Live Action Short Film.

Cast 
 Christine Cavanaugh as Pepper
 Julie Harris as Ethel
 Kenneth Moskow as Julian
 Mark Pellegrino as Jack
 Kelly Preston as Ginger
 Rod Steiger as Joe
 Sam Whipple as Joe Jr.

Home Media 
The film was released on DVD in Australia in "Perverse Destiny, Volume 2" with three other short films:
Texan (1994), starring Dana Delaney, written by David Mamet
Museum of Love (1996), starring and directed by Christian Slater
The Gift (1993), directed by Laura Dern

References

External links 

1995 films
1995 short films
American independent films
American short films
1990s English-language films
1990s American films